are hair ornaments used in traditional Japanese hairstyles. The term  refers to a wide variety of accessories, including long, rigid hairpins, barrettes, fabric flowers and fabric hair ties. 

In the English-speaking world, the term  is typically used to refer to hair ornaments made from layers of folded cloth used to form flowers, or the technique of folding used to make the flowers.

History
 were first used in Japan during the Jōmon period. During that time, the wearing of a single thin rod or stick was considered to hold powers to ward off evil spirits, with people wearing them in their hair for protective purposes. The Jōmon period also saw the introduction of hair combs.

During the Nara period, a variety of Chinese cultural aspects and items were brought to Japan through mutual trade and envoys. The items brought back from China included Chinese hairpins (written with the same Chinese character as ), amongst other hair ornaments such as Chinese combs.

During the Heian period, hairstyles shifted from being worn up to being worn long, and tied back relatively low. During this time period, the term  began to be used as a general term for any hair ornament, including combs and hairpins. 

During the Azuchi-Momoyama period, hairstyles changed from the  style, to the wider variety of styles worn up – predecessors of modern  styles, which made more use of hair ornaments.

 came into wider use during the Edo period, when hairstyles became larger and more complicated, using a larger number of ornaments. Artisans began to produce more finely crafted products, including some hair ornaments that could be used as defensive weapons.

Modern day

As such, few people wear  with traditional hairstyles. However,  can be, and still are, worn with everyday hairstyles as simple hair accessories; there are a number of varieties and styles of wearing , with modern varieties worn as hairclips both common and popular. In 1982,  were officially designated as a traditional Japanese handcraft in the Tokyo region.

Craftsmanship
Professional  craftspeople typically undergo a five- to 10-year traditional apprenticeship to learn the trade. Similarly to the combs used to create  hairstyles, only a small number of traditionally-trained  craftspeople are left practising the trade within Japan; from 2002 to 2010, their estimated number in the country decreased from 15 to five. 

However, the  technique of petal-folded fabric  has become a popular craft amongst hobbyists, with a number of books, kits and lessons available on the subject, from sources such as the Tsumami Kanzashi Museum in Shinjuku.

Types
 are fabricated from a wide range of materials, such as lacquered wood, gold and silver plated metal, tortoiseshell, silk, and recently, plastic. Early plastic  made out of materials such as bakelite are considered to be highly valued as collectables.

There are a number of basic  styles, with the wear of each typically and traditionally following seasonal arrangements; however, in the present day, the use of seasonal  is observed only by geisha, their apprentices,  re-enactors and in the costumes for kabuki plays.

For , the size, shape, variety and number of  can indicate seniority and the stage of apprenticeship, used in tangent with a number of different hairstyles throughout the apprenticeship.

Basic styles
Despite seasonal and (in the instance of bridalwear) occasional variation, most  that are not considered to be  fall into one of a number of basic shapes and appearances.

Other styles

– literally meaning "pinched " – are traditional  made of squares of dyed or printed silk, folded into a number of shapes to represent flowers, plants and animals. 

Each square is folded multiple times with the aid of tweezers and glued onto a base using rice glue.

 are usually made from a cluster of  flowers, and may include -style strips of metal or long streamers of petals dangling from the main  piece.  are well-known for wearing  that are typically larger than average.

Generally,  are worn in pairs, one on either side of the head, often with a complementary . The flowers are glued to backings of metal or cardboard that are attached to a wire and are bunched together to make bouquets and other arrangements.

Geisha, and especially , wear different  for each month of the year.

Seasonal  motifs
 are highly seasonal, though typically the only people in Japan who follow the seasons closely enough to register seasonal changes are geisha and their apprentices. Since  wear more elaborate  than their senior geisha, seasonal changes are even more important for them.

January – The design of January  usually has an auspicious New Years' theme.  is a popular choice – a combination of pine, bamboo and plum blossoms in green, red and white. Other popular motifs are sparrows, spinning tops and battledore paddles.
February – Usually trailing deep pink or red plum blossoms, said to symbolise young love and the approach of spring. Another less common theme is the pinwheel and the flowerball that is worn for Setsubun.
March – Trailing yellow and white rapeseed flowers and butterflies, as well as peach blossoms, narcissus, camellia and peonies.
April – Trailing soft pink cherry blossoma mixed with butterflies and  lanterns, signalling the approach of summer. Cherry blossom viewing at this time of year is a major cultural event in Japan.  consisting of a single silver (or sometimes gold) butterfly made of  cord are common.
May – Trailing purple wisteria and flag irises, usually in blue or pink. Irises denote the height of spring while wisteria is a flower often associated with the Imperial Court (wisteria viewing parties have been celebrated by Japanese nobles since the Heian period).
June – Trailing green willow leaves with carnations/pinks, or less commonly hydrangea flowers. This month is the rainy season in Japan, and therefore willow (a water-loving tree) and blue hydrangeas are appropriate.
July –  featuring a display of fans (usually round  fans, but occasionally folding  fans) are featured. The fans refer to the Gion Festival which takes place at this time. The motifs featured on a 's fan  vary each year, in line with the festival. There are common themes such as dragonflies and lines denoting swirling water. Other  worn during July are fireworks  and dewdrops on grass.
August – Large morning glory or  grass. The  grass appears as a starburst of spines made of silvered paper. Senior  wear white-backed silver petals and junior  wear pink-backed silver petals.
September – Japanese bellflower. The purple tones are traditionally associated with autumn. Often these will be mixed with bush clover.
October – Chrysanthemum. These are well loved in Japan and are a symbol of the Imperial Family. Senior  will wear one large flower while junior  will wear a cluster of small flowers. Typical colours include pink, white, red, yellow, and purple.
November – Trailing autumnal leaves that are usually composed of the very popular Japanese maple. Maple viewing is the autumnal equivalent of cherry blossom viewing in Japan. Ginkgo and liquidambar leaves are also seen.
December – The Japanese make  at this time of year, and often decorate trees with them to represent white flowers. It is thought to be good luck to wear  featuring , or rice-cake flowers. December  also feature two , name plates used by kabuki actors, which are initially blank. Traditionally,  visit the Minamiza Theatre and ask two of their favourite kabuki actors to autograph them with their kabuki nom de plume.  for senior  feature green bamboo leaves while junior  have a colourful assortment of lucky charms.
New Year – At this time of year all  and geisha wear un-husked ears of rice in their hairstyles ( wear it on the right while geisha wear it on the left). These  also feature eyeless white doves. The  and geisha fill in one eye and ask somebody they like to draw the other for good luck in the coming year.

See also
 Chinese hairpin

 Comb
 Hair stick
 Hairpin
 – Chinese combs

References

External links

 The kanzashi atelier of Kuniko Kanawa, сertified Edo Tsumami Kanzashi artisan
 Hairstyles of Kyoto Maiko, from Immortal Geisha
 Kanzashi-Core Long standing kanzashi site of designer Vivien Hoffpauir. 
 History of Kanzashi 

Hairdressing
Headgear
Japanese headgear
Japanese words and phrases